Herbert J. Rushton (February 14, 1877December 11, 1947) was a Michigan politician.

Early life
Rushton was born in Manchester, Michigan on February 14, 1877 to parents Thomas F. and Mary Rushton. Rushton was of English and Irish descent.

Education
Rushton  attended high school in Napoleon, Michigan. Rushton then attended the University of Michigan. Rushton then studied law with a lawyer in Ann Arbor, Michigan. In 1905, Rushton moved to Washington due to health concerns. There, Rushton was admitted the Washington state bar in 1907. Rushton moved back to Michigan in 1908.

Career
Upon returning to Michigan, Rushton practiced law, first in Menominee, then in Escanaba, Michigan. Rushton served as the Escanaba city attorney on and off for 21 years. Rushton was Delta County Prosecuting Attorney from 1913 to 1914. On November 2, 1926, Rushton was elected to the Michigan Senate where he represented the 30th district from January 5, 1927 to 1932. In 1927, Rushton drafted the bill which would create the Upper Peninsula State Fair. Rushton was a delegate to the Republican National Convention from Michigan in 1932 and in 1936. In 1936, Rushton ran unsuccessfully for the position of United States Representative from Michigan's 11th District. Rushton served as Michigan Attorney General from 1941 to 1944.

Personal life
Rushton was married to Loretta Payne. Together they had four children. Rushton was a member of the Freemasons and of the Knights Templar. Rushton was Presbyterian.

Death
Rushton died on December 11, 1947 in Escanaba, Michigan. He was interred at Lakeview Cemetery in Escanaba.

References

1877 births
1947 deaths
American Freemasons
Presbyterians from Michigan
Michigan lawyers
Republican Party Michigan state senators
Michigan Attorneys General
University of Michigan alumni
Burials in Michigan
20th-century American politicians
20th-century American lawyers